NetWars is an IPX-based 3D vector-graphics video game released by Novell in 1993 for MS-DOS compatible operating systems to demonstrate NetWare capabilities. It was written by Edward N. Hill, Jr., one of Novell's engineers in its European Development Centre in Hungerford, UK. Development started in 1989.

Release
NetWars 2.06 came bundled with Novell DOS 7 and Personal NetWare 1.0, replacing the text-based Snipes that came with NetWare Lite 1.1 since 1991, a newer implementation of the original Snipes, that traditionally came with Novell NetWare.

Legacy
Since 1997, a much improved version 3 named Advanced NetWars shipped with Caldera OpenDOS 7.01, DR-DOS 7.02 and DR-DOS 7.03. It added support for SoundBlaster sound, Joystick control, up to six players in multi-player mode, missiles and computer-controlled ships in multi-player mode, and it featured a new multi-player shoot-out mode, an improved single-player mode, an external view mode, as well as a shape editor NWDRAW to design own space-ships. Despite all these additions, the executable maintained a file size of less than 77 KB.

NetWars and Advanced NetWars inspired the development of clones such as Ingmar Frank's NetWarsGL for Win32 platforms with OpenGL in 2002 to 2004, or the Botolib-based NetWorst.

References

External links

A video of Advanced NetWars gameplay
NetWars clone NetWarsGL for Win32/OpenGL
Advanced NetWars clone NetWorst

1993 video games
DOS games
DOS-only games
Multiplayer online games
Novell software
Shoot 'em ups
Video games developed in the United Kingdom